Longmont United Hospital is a hospital in Longmont, Colorado, United States.

The hospital employs more than 1200 staff. It includes a 24-hour emergency department, and is served by many ambulance companies.

The hospital is a level 3 trauma center in Boulder County, Colorado.

In August 2015, Longmont United Hospital was acquired by the larger healthcare system, Centura Health. The hospital has 4 Centura Health Physician Group clinic locations affiliated with the hospital in Longmont, Lyons, Berthoud and Niwot.

History 
Since its foundation in 1959, Longmont United Hospital has provided people throughout Boulder County and the surrounding communities compassionate, personalized, whole-person care. Longmont United Hospital is a full-service, award-winning, 201-bed hospital.

The Longmont Community Hospital Association was organized in 1955 by a group of business leaders and physicians with the express purpose of establishing a community hospital for the care and treatment of the sick.  The citizens of the community raised the necessary funds to construct the hospital and it opened in 1959 with 50 beds and 19 physicians.

LUH officially joined Centura Health in 2015, Colorado's largest health network with 17 hospitals and a number of senior living communities, medical clinics, Flight for Life® Colorado, and home care and hospice services, Longmont United Hospital provides care that transcends the walls of the hospital to nurture the health of its communities.

References

External links
 

Hospitals in Colorado
Buildings and structures in Boulder County, Colorado
Longmont, Colorado